The Nomads RFC was created in 1993 to provide playing and social opportunities for players not involved in the Six Nations competition and is generally described as being the women's equivalent of men's rugby's Barbarians as teams include internationals, or near internationals, from several countries.

Until 2008 all of their matches had taken place in England or Wales, against either England A or the Welsh national team. However, in the August 2008 a Nomad team toured outside the UK for the first time when they visited South Africa, playing two games against the national team as curtain raisers to two men's tri-nations internationals.

Results summary

Nomad matches

Recent call-ups

Coaching staff
 Fiona Stockley – Manager

Squad for 2014
Nomads squad for the tests against South Africa in London

Squad for 2015
Nomads squad for the tests against Scotland in Edinburgh

External links
Preview of 2010 game v Wales, including background to the club.

Women's rugby union teams
Multinational rugby union teams